Morten Pettersen (born 25 February 1970) is a retired Norwegian football midfielder.

He joined IK Start from FK Jerv ahead of the 1990 season, and remained there throughout 1999 except for two seasons at SK Brann.

References

1970 births
Living people
People from Grimstad
Norwegian footballers
FK Jerv players
IK Start players
SK Brann players
Norwegian First Division players
Eliteserien players
Association football midfielders
Norway under-21 international footballers
Sportspeople from Agder